Big Brother 4 is the fourth season of various versions of Big Brother and may refer to:

Big Brother 2002 (Netherlands), the 2002 Dutch edition of Big Brother
Gran Hermano Spain (Season 4), the 2002-2003 edition of Big Brother in Spain
Big Brother Germany (Season 4), the 2003 German edition of Big Brother
Big Brother 4 (UK), the 2003 UK edition of Big Brother
Big Brother 4 (U.S.), the 2003 US edition of Big Brother
Big Brother 4 (Australia), the 2004 Australian edition of Big Brother
Big Brother Brasil 4, the 2004 Brazilian edition of Big Brother
Grande Fratello Season 4, the first 2004 edition of Big Brother in Italy
Big Brother 4 (Big Mother), the 2005 Greek edition of Big Brother
Gran Hermano Argentina (Season 4), the first 2007 Argentinian edition of Big Brother
Big Brother 4 (Croatia), the 2007 Croatian edition of Big Brother
Big Brother 4 (Bulgaria), the 2008 Bulgarian edition of Big Brother
Big Brother 2008 (Finland), the 2008 edition of Big Brother in Finland
Big Brother Africa (season 4), the 2009 African edition of Big Brother
Secret Story 2010 (France), the 2010 edition of Big Brother in France
Bigg Boss (Season 4), the 2010-2011 edition of Big Brother in India
Veliki brat 2011, the 2011 edition of Big Brother in Serbia, Bosnia and Herzegovina, Macedonia, Montenegro, and Croatia
Big Brother Norway (Season 4), the 2011 edition of Big Brother in Norway
Pinoy Big Brother (season 4), the 2011-2012 edition of Big Brother in the Philippines
Big Brother 2012 (Denmark), the 2012 Danish edition of Big Brother
HaAh HaGadol 4, the 2012 edition of Big Brother in Israel
Secret Story 4 (Portugal), the 2013 edition of Big Brother in Portugal
Big Brother Canada (season 4), the 2016 edition of Big Brother Canada

See also
 Big Brother (franchise)
 Big Brother (disambiguation)